Vozdvizhenka is a rural locality (a selo) and the administrative center of Vozdvizhensky Selsoviet, Kulundinsky District, Altai Krai, Russia. The population was 233 as of 2013. There are two streets.

Geography 
Vozdvizhenka is located 34 km north of Kulunda (the district's administrative centre) by road. Novorossiyka is the nearest rural locality.

References 

Rural localities in Kulundinsky District